Armatage can refer to:

People
John Armatage

Places
Armatage, Minneapolis, Minnesota

See also
Armitage (disambiguation)